Ronald Maul (born 13 February 1973) is a German former professional footballer who played as a left midfielder. He works as a team manager for FC Gütersloh 2000.

Club career 
After 20 years of professional football, Maul retired in February 2010. In the German top-flight he amassed 178 appearances.

International career 
Maul was capped twice by Germany, both appearances coming at the 1999 FIFA Confederations Cup.

Honours 
Arminia Bielefeld
 2. Bundesliga: 1998–99; Runner-up 1995–96

Rot-Weiß Ahlen
 Regionalliga Nord: 2007–08

References

External links 
 
 
 

1973 births
Living people
German footballers
Association football midfielders
Association football fullbacks
Germany international footballers
Germany B international footballers
1999 FIFA Confederations Cup players
VfL Osnabrück players
Arminia Bielefeld players
Hamburger SV players
FC Hansa Rostock players
FC Carl Zeiss Jena players
Rot Weiss Ahlen players
Bundesliga players
2. Bundesliga players
Sportspeople from Jena